Tavapy is a district located in the Alto Paraná Department of Paraguay. It was previously part of Santa Rosa del Monday and it was created as a district on May 26, 2011.

References 

Districts of Alto Paraná Department
2011 establishments in Paraguay